The Château de Saint-Sauveur-le-Vicomte is a ruined castle in the commune of Saint-Sauveur-le-Vicomte in the Manche département of France.

The castle, dating from the 11th and 12th centuries, was besieged twice during the Hundred Years' War. The remains consist of a fortified enceinte with towers and a massive keep.

The castle is open to the public. It has been listed since 1840 as a monument historique by the French Ministry of Culture.

See also
List of castles in France

References

External links
 

Castles in Manche
Monuments historiques of Manche
Ruined castles in Normandy